A timeline of calculus and mathematical analysis.

Before 500BC 
Ancient Babylonians discovered Trapezoid rule while doing astronomical observations of Jupiter.

500BC to 1600

 5th century BC - The Zeno's paradoxes,
 5th century BC - Antiphon attempts to square the circle,
 5th century BC - Democritus finds the volume of cone is 1/3 of volume of cylinder,
 4th century BC - Eudoxus of Cnidus develops the method of exhaustion,
 3rd century BC - Archimedes displays geometric series in The Quadrature of the Parabola. Archimedes also discovers a method which is similar to differential calculus.
 3rd century BC - Archimedes develops  a concept of the indivisibles—a precursor to infinitesimals—allowing him to solve several problems using methods now termed as integral calculus. Archimedes also derives several formulae for determining the area and volume of various solids including sphere,cone, paraboloid and hyperboloid.
 3rd century - Liu Hui rediscovers the method of exhaustion in order to find the area of a circle.
 4th century - The Pappus's centroid theorem,
 5th century - Zu Chongzhi established a method that would later be called Cavalieri's principle to find the volume of a sphere. 
 600 - Liu Zhuo is the first person to use second-order interpolation for computing the positions of the sun and the moon.
 862 - The Banu Musa brothers write the "Book on the Measurement of Plane and Spherical Figures", 
 9th century - Thābit ibn Qurra discusses the quadrature of the parabola and the volume of different types of conic sections.
 14th century - Nicole Oresme proves of the divergence of the harmonic series,
 1445 - Nicholas of Cusa attempts to square the circle,
 1501 - Nilakantha Somayaji writes the Tantrasamgraha, which contains the Madhava's discoveries,
 1548 - Francesco Maurolico attempted to calculate the barycenter of various bodies (pyramid, paraboloid, etc.),
 1550 - Jyeshtadeva writes the Yuktibhāṣā, a commentary to Nilakantha's Tantrasamgraha,
 1560 - Sankara Variar writes the Kriyakramakari,
 1565 - Federico Commandino publishes De centro Gravitati,
 1588 - Commandino's translation of Pappus' Collectio gets published,
 1593 - François Viète discovers the first infinite product in the history of mathematics,

17th century

 1606 - Luca Valerio applies methods of Archimedes to find volumes and centres of gravity of solid bodies,
 1609 - Johannes Kepler computes the integral ,
 1611 - Thomas Harriot discovers an interpolation formula similar to Newton's interpolation formula,
 1615 - Johannes Kepler publishes Nova stereometria doliorum,
 1620 - Grégoire de Saint-Vincent discovers that the area under a hyperbola represented a logarithm,
 1624 - Henry Briggs publishes Arithmetica Logarithmica,
 1629 - Pierre de Fermat discovers his method of maxima and minima, precursor of the derivative concept,
 1634 - Gilles de Roberval shows that the area under a cycloid is three times the area of its generating circle,
 1635 - Bonaventura Cavalieri publishes Geometria Indivisibilibus,
 1637 - René Descartes publishes La Géométrie,
 1638 - Galileo Galilei publishes Two New Sciences,
 1644 - Evangelista Torricelli publishes Opera geometrica,
 1644 - Fermat's methods of maxima and minima published by Pierre Hérigone,
 1647 - Cavalieri computes the integral ,
 1647 - Grégoire de Saint-Vincent publishes Opus Geometricum,
 1650 - Pietro Mengoli proves of the divergence of the harmonic series,
 1656 - John Wallis publishes Arithmetica Infinitorum,
 1658 - Christopher Wren shows that the length of a cycloid is four times the diameter of its generating circle,
 1659 - Second edition of Van Schooten's Latin translation of Descartes' Geometry with appendices by Hudde and Heuraet,
 1665 - Isaac Newton discovers the generalized binomial theorem and develops his version of infinitesimal calculus,
 1667 - James Gregory publishes Vera circuli et hyperbolae quadratura,
 1668 - Nicholas Mercator publishes Logarithmotechnia,
 1668 - James Gregory computes the integral of the secant function,
 1670 - Isaac Barrow publishes Lectiones Geometricae,
 1672 - René-François de Sluse publishes A Method of Drawing Tangents to All Geometrical Curves,
 1673 - Gottfried Leibniz also develops his version of infinitesimal calculus,
 1675 - Isaac Newton invents a Newton's method for the computation of roots of a function,
 1675 - Leibniz uses the modern notation for an integral for the first time,
 1677 - Leibniz discovers the rules for differentiating products, quotients, and the function of a function.
 1683 - Jacob Bernoulli discovers the number ,
 1684 - Leibniz publishes his first paper on calculus,
 1686 - The first appearance in print of the  notation for integrals,
 1687 - Isaac Newton publishes Philosophiæ Naturalis Principia Mathematica,
 1691 - The first proof of Rolle's theorem is given by Michel Rolle,
 1691 - Leibniz discovers the technique of separation of variables for ordinary differential equations,
 1694 - Johann Bernoulli discovers the L'Hôpital's rule,
 1696 - Guillaume de L'Hôpital publishes Analyse des Infiniment Petits, the first calculus textbook,
 1696 - Jakob Bernoulli and Johann Bernoulli solve the brachistochrone problem, the first result in the calculus of variations.

18th century

 1711 - Isaac Newton publishes De analysi per aequationes numero terminorum infinitas,
 1712 - Brook Taylor develops Taylor series,
 1722 - Roger Cotes computes the derivative of sine in his Harmonia Mensurarum,
 1730 - James Stirling publishes The Differential Method,
 1734 - George Berkeley publishes The Analyst,
 1734 - Leonhard Euler introduces the integrating factor technique for solving first-order ordinary differential equations,
 1735 - Leonhard Euler solves the Basel problem, relating an infinite series to π,
 1736 - Newton's Method of Fluxions posthumously published,
 1737 - Thomas Simpson publishes Treatise of Fluxions,
 1739 - Leonhard Euler solves the general homogeneous linear ordinary differential equation with constant coefficients,
 1742 - Modern definion of logarithm by William Gardiner, 
 1742 - Colin Maclaurin publishes Treatise on Fluxions,
 1748 - Euler publishes Introductio in analysin infinitorum,
 1748 - Maria Gaetana Agnesi discusses analysis in Instituzioni Analitiche ad Uso della Gioventu Italiana,
 1762 - Joseph Louis Lagrange discovers the divergence theorem,
 1797 - Lagrange publishes Théorie des fonctions analytiques,

19th century

 1807 - Joseph Fourier announces his discoveries about the trigonometric decomposition of functions,
 1811 - Carl Friedrich Gauss discusses the meaning of integrals with complex limits and briefly examines the dependence of such integrals on the chosen path of integration,
 1815 - Siméon Denis Poisson carries out integrations along paths in the complex plane,
 1817 - Bernard Bolzano presents the intermediate value theorem — a continuous function which is negative at one point and positive at another point must be zero for at least one point in between,
 1822 - Augustin-Louis Cauchy presents the Cauchy integral theorem for integration around the boundary of a rectangle in the complex plane,
 1825 - Augustin-Louis Cauchy presents the Cauchy integral theorem for general integration paths—he assumes the function being integrated has a continuous derivative, and he introduces the theory of residues in complex analysis,
 1825 - André-Marie Ampère discovers Stokes' theorem,
 1828 - George Green introduces Green's theorem,
 1831 - Mikhail Vasilievich Ostrogradsky rediscovers and gives the first proof of the divergence theorem earlier described by Lagrange, Gauss and Green,
 1841 - Karl Weierstrass discovers but does not publish the Laurent expansion theorem,
 1843 - Pierre-Alphonse Laurent discovers and presents the Laurent expansion theorem,
 1850 - Victor Alexandre Puiseux distinguishes between poles and branch points and introduces the concept of essential singular points,
 1850 - George Gabriel Stokes rediscovers and proves Stokes' theorem,
 1861 - Karl Weierstrass starts to use the language of epsilons and deltas,
 1873 - Georg Frobenius presents his method for finding series solutions to linear differential equations with regular singular points,

20th century

 1908 - Josip Plemelj solves the Riemann problem about the existence of a differential equation with a given monodromic group and uses Sokhotsky  - Plemelj formulae,
 1966 - Abraham Robinson presents non-standard analysis.
 1985 - Louis de Branges de Bourcia proves the Bieberbach conjecture,

See also

References

Calculus and mathematical analysis